Yolanda Alzola (born 3 November 1970) is a Spanish actress and television presenter from Guernica, Vizcaya. She presents the Decogarden program on Canal Nova. She has appeared in television series such as Galakthica, Lo que faltaba, A plena luz, and Sabor a verano, and films such as Calor... y celos (1996), Carretera y manta (2000) and Reinas (2005).

References

External links
Official site 

Spanish television actresses
Spanish television presenters
1970 births
Living people
Spanish women television presenters
People from Guernica
Spanish film actresses
Actresses from the Basque Country (autonomous community)
20th-century Spanish actresses
21st-century Spanish actresses